MFС Mykolaiv (Municipal Football Club "Mykolaiv") is a Ukrainian football club based in Mykolaiv.

It is one of the oldest football clubs that exists in Ukraine. Originally was established as a football team of the Black Sea Shipyard, since dissolution of the Soviet Union and cutting of the shipyard's budget which was based mostly on military contacts, it is sponsored mostly by the city of Mykolaiv.

Description

Names
 1920–1922 Naval Factory
 1922–1926 Marti-Badin Factory
 1926–1926 Metalisty Mykolaiv
 1927–1928 Raikom Metalistiv
 1929–1935 Marti Factory
 1936–1940 Sudnobudivnyk Mykolaiv
 1941–1944 Nazi Germany occupation of Ukraine
 1944–1949 Sudnobudivnyk Mykolaiv
 1951–1952 Mykolaiv City
 1953–1959 Avanhard Mykolaiv
 1960–1965 Sudnobudivnyk Mykolaiv
 1966–1966 Budivelnyk Mykolaiv
 1967–1991 Sudnobudivnyk Mykolaiv
 1992–1994 Evis Mykolaiv
 1994–2002 SC Mykolaiv
 2002- MFC Mykolaiv

History
The club was founded in 1920 under the name Sudostroitel (Sudnobudivnyk) Mykolaiv. It is the oldest continuously playing club in the country that competes on the professional level.

Throughout the Soviet times and until the 1990s, it mostly played under the name of Sudnobudivnyk meaning Shipbuilder associated with the Black Sea Shipyard.

MFC Mykolaiv took part in the first Ukrainian Premier League season in 1992 under the name FC Evis Mykolaiv, after being initially chosen to participate for being one of the top 9 (of 11) Ukrainian teams from the West Division of the Soviet Second League 1991. The club is one of the holders of the unfortunate distinction as being the team to be demoted three times from the Ukrainian Premier League.

MFС Mykolaiv's best achievement in the Ukrainian Premier League was 13th place (in 1994–95). From 1994, the club was known as SC Mykolaiv, FC Mykolaiv since 2000, and MFC Mykolaiv since 2006.

MFC Mykolaiv became insolvent and ceased to exist after the City Administration of Mykolaiv informed the PFL that the team would not be competing in the 2008/09 Persha Liha season. The team then requested re-admittance to the PFL, but it was too late as the calendar was already set up. The PFL allowed the club to compete in the Druha Liha, but only in the next season. The administration of the Dynamo Kyiv extended its helping hand by withdrawing its junior team Dynamo-3 Kyiv from the Second League and, thus, for Mykolaiv to be placed instead of it.

MFC Mykolaiv reached 1st place in Druha Liha group A in 2010–11 season and was promoted to Persha Liha.

Colours are blue and white hooped shirts, white shorts.

Honors
Football Championship of the Ukrainian SSR (top tier)
Runners-up (1): 1927
Football Championship of the Ukrainian SSR (2nd tier)
Winners (1): 1936
Class B (2nd tier) 
Runners-up (1): 1960
Soviet Second League 
Winners (1): 1974
Runners-up (2): 1971, 1990 
Ukrainian Persha Liha
 Winners (1): 1997-98
 Runners-up (1): 1993-94
Ukrainian Druha Liha
 Winners (2): 2005/06 (Group B), 2010-11 (Group A)

League and cup history
Soviet competitions

Ukrainian competitions

Information since Ukrainian Independence

{|class="wikitable"
|-bgcolor="#efefef"
! Season
! Div.
! Pos.
! Pl.
! W
! D
! L
! GS
! GA
! P
!Domestic Cup
!colspan=2|Europe
!Notes
|-
|align=center|1992
|align=center|1st "A"
|align=center|9
|align=center|18
|align=center|3
|align=center|4
|align=center|11
|align=center|12
|align=center|29
|align=center|10
|align=center| finals
|align=center|
|align=center|
|align=center bgcolor=Red|Relegated
|-bgcolor=LightCyan
|align=center|1992–93
|align=center|2nd
|align=center|7
|align=center|42
|align=center|18
|align=center|11
|align=center|13
|align=center|60
|align=center|39
|align=center|47
|align=center| finals
|align=center|
|align=center|
|align=center|
|-bgcolor=LightCyan
|align=center|1993–94
|align=center|2nd
|align=center bgcolor=silver|2
|align=center|38
|align=center|25
|align=center|6
|align=center|7
|align=center|76
|align=center|32
|align=center|56
|align=center| finals
|align=center|
|align=center|
|align=center bgcolor=lightgreen|Promoted
|-
|align=center|1994–95
|align=center|1st
|align=center|13
|align=center|34
|align=center|11
|align=center|5
|align=center|18
|align=center|33
|align=center|59
|align=center|38
|align=center| finals
|align=center|
|align=center|
|align=center|
|-
|align=center|1995–96
|align=center|1st
|align=center|16
|align=center|34
|align=center|10
|align=center|8
|align=center|16
|align=center|37
|align=center|53
|align=center|38
|align=center| finals
|align=center|
|align=center|
|align=center bgcolor=Red|Relegated
|-bgcolor=LightCyan
|align=center|1996–97
|align=center|2nd
|align=center|7
|align=center|46
|align=center|21
|align=center|12
|align=center|13
|align=center|66
|align=center|37
|align=center|75
|align=center| finals
|align=center|
|align=center|
|align=center|
|-bgcolor=LightCyan
|align=center|1997–98
|align=center|2nd
|align=center bgcolor=gold|1
|align=center|42
|align=center|31
|align=center|5
|align=center|6
|align=center|94
|align=center|31
|align=center|98
|align=center| finals
|align=center|
|align=center|
|align=center bgcolor=lightgreen|Promoted
|-
|align=center|1998–99
|align=center|1st
|align=center|16
|align=center|30
|align=center|2
|align=center|6
|align=center|22
|align=center|18
|align=center|67
|align=center|12
|align=center| finals
|align=center|
|align=center|
|align=center bgcolor=Red|Relegated
|-bgcolor=LightCyan
|align=center|1999–00
|align=center|2nd
|align=center|6
|align=center|34
|align=center|15
|align=center|7
|align=center|12
|align=center|40
|align=center|38
|align=center|52
|align=center| finals
|align=center|
|align=center|
|align=center|
|-bgcolor=LightCyan
|align=center|2000–01
|align=center|2nd
|align=center|4
|align=center|34
|align=center|17
|align=center|8
|align=center|9
|align=center|41
|align=center|30
|align=center|59
|align=center| finals
|align=center|
|align=center|
|align=center|
|-bgcolor=LightCyan
|align=center|2001–02
|align=center|2nd
|align=center|10
|align=center|34
|align=center|12
|align=center|10
|align=center|12
|align=center|37
|align=center|44
|align=center|46
|align=center|4th round
|align=center|
|align=center|
|align=center|
|-bgcolor=LightCyan
|align=center|2002–03
|align=center|2nd
|align=center|5
|align=center|34
|align=center|15
|align=center|7
|align=center|12
|align=center|30
|align=center|37
|align=center|52
|align=center| finals
|align=center|
|align=center|
|align=center|
|-bgcolor=LightCyan
|align=center|2003–04
|align=center|2nd
|align=center|12
|align=center|34
|align=center|11
|align=center|9
|align=center|14
|align=center|31
|align=center|31
|align=center|42
|align=center| finals
|align=center|
|align=center|
|align=center|
|-bgcolor=LightCyan
|align=center|2004–05
|align=center|2nd
|align=center|17
|align=center|34
|align=center|8
|align=center|7
|align=center|19
|align=center|15
|align=center|40
|align=center|31
|align=center| finals
|align=center|
|align=center|
|align=center bgcolor=Red|Relegated
|-bgcolor=PowderBlue
|align=center|2005–06
|align=center|3rd "A"
|align=center bgcolor=gold|1
|align=center|28
|align=center|22
|align=center|3
|align=center|3
|align=center|56
|align=center|11
|align=center|69
|align=center| finals
|align=center|
|align=center|
|align=center bgcolor=lightgreen|Promoted
|-bgcolor=LightCyan
|align=center|2006–07
|align=center|2nd
|align=center|13
|align=center|36
|align=center|12
|align=center|10
|align=center|14
|align=center|33
|align=center|40
|align=center|46
|align=center| finals
|align=center|
|align=center|
|align=center|
|-bgcolor=LightCyan
|align=center|2007–08
|align=center|2nd
|align=center|10
|align=center|38
|align=center|13
|align=center|13
|align=center|12
|align=center|33
|align=center|27
|align=center|52
|align=center| finals
|align=center|
|align=center|
|align=center bgcolor=red|Relegated
|-bgcolor=PowderBlue
|align=center|2008–09
|align=center|3rd "A"
|align=center|11
|align=center|32
|align=center|11
|align=center|10
|align=center|11
|align=center|28
|align=center|27
|align=center|43
|align=center|Did not enter
|align=center|
|align=center|
|align=center|
|-bgcolor=PowderBlue
|align=center|2009–10
|align=center|3rd "A"
|align=center|4
|align=center|20
|align=center|11
|align=center|6
|align=center|3
|align=center|30
|align=center|13
|align=center|39
|align=center| finals
|align=center|
|align=center|
|align=center|
|-bgcolor=PowderBlue
|align=center|2010–11
|align=center|3rd "A"
|align=center bgcolor=gold|1
|align=center|22
|align=center|15
|align=center|3
|align=center|4
|align=center|29
|align=center|12
|align=center|48
|align=center| finals
|align=center|
|align=center|
|align=center bgcolor=lightgreen|Promoted
|-bgcolor=LightCyan
|align=center|2011–12
|align=center|2nd
|align=center|16
|align=center|34
|align=center|9
|align=center|4
|align=center|21
|align=center|33
|align=center|51
|align=center|28
|align=center| finals
|align=center|
|align=center| 
|align=center|-3
|-bgcolor=LightCyan
|align=center|2012–13
|align=center|2nd
|align=center|6
|align=center|34 	
|align=center|16 	
|align=center|9 	
|align=center|9 	
|align=center|45 	
|align=center|41 	
|align=center|54
|align=center| finals
|align=center|
|align=center|
|align=center|-3
|-bgcolor=LightCyan
|align=center|2013–14
|align=center|2nd
|align=center|16
|align=center|30
|align=center| 9
|align=center|4
|align=center|17
|align=center|34
|align=center|49
|align=center|31
|align=center| finals
|align=center|
|align=center|
|align=center|
|-bgcolor=LightCyan
|align=center|2014–15
|align=center|2nd
|align=center|14
|align=center|30
|align=center|6
|align=center|6
|align=center|18
|align=center|34
|align=center|67
|align=center|24
|align=center| finals
|align=center|
|align=center|
|align=center|
|-bgcolor=LightCyan
|align=center|2015–16
|align=center|2nd
|align=center|7
|align=center|30 	
|align=center|13 	
|align=center|8 	
|align=center|9 	
|align=center|34 	
|align=center|27 		
|align=center|44
|align=center| finals
|align=center|
|align=center|
|align=center|-3
|-bgcolor=LightCyan
|align=center|2016–17
|align=center|2nd
|align=center|14
|align=center|34 	
|align=center|11 	
|align=center|4 	
|align=center|19 	
|align=center|35 	
|align=center|44 	
|align=center|37
|align=center bgcolor=tan| finals
|align=center|
|align=center|
|align=center|
|-bgcolor=LightCyan
|align=center|2017–18
|align=center|2nd
|align=center|10
|align=center|34         	
|align=center|12   	
|align=center|8  	
|align=center|14  
|align=center|39	
|align=center|50          
|align=center|44
|align=center| finals
|align=center|
|align=center|
|align=center|
|-bgcolor=LightCyan
|align=center|2018–19
|align=center|2nd
|align=center|9
|align=center|28
|align=center|10
|align=center|7
|align=center|11
|align=center|34
|align=center|32
|align=center|37
|align=center| finals
|align=center|
|align=center|
|align=center|
|-bgcolor=LightCyan
|align=center|2019–20
|align=center|2nd
|align=center|11
|align=center|30 	
|align=center|8 	
|align=center|10 	
|align=center|12 	
|align=center|45 	
|align=center|45 	
|align=center|34
|align=center| finals
|align=center|
|align=center|
|align=center|
|-bgcolor=LightCyan
|align=center|2020–21
|align=center|2nd
|align=center|4
|align=center|30 	
|align=center|15 	
|align=center|8 	
|align=center|7 	
|align=center|49 	
|align=center|23 	 
|align=center|53
|align=center| finals
|align=center|
|align=center|
|align=center|
|}

Current squad

Coaching staff
 Head coach – Serhiy Shevchenko
 Assistant coach – Anatoliy Didenko
 GK coach – Vacant

MFC Mykolaiv-2

The club entered their reserve team into the Ukrainian Second League for the 2017–18 season.

{|class="wikitable"
|-bgcolor="#efefef"
! Season
! Div.
! Pos.
! Pl.
! W
! D
! L
! GS
! GA
! P
!Domestic Cup
!colspan=2|Europe
!Notes
|-
|align=center|1996–97
|align=center|4th
|align=center|3
|align=center|8
|align=center|0
|align=center|0
|align=center|8
|align=center|0
|align=center|5
|align=center|0
|align=center|
|align=center|
|align=center|
|align=center|
|-
|align=center colspan=14|did not participate
|-
|align=center|2017–18
|align=center|3rd
|align=center|9
|align=center|33  
|align=center|10  
|align=center|7  
|align=center|16  
|align=center|41  
|align=center|58
|align=center|37
|align=center|
|align=center|
|align=center|
|align=center|
|-
|align=center|2018–19
|align=center|3rd
|align=center|9
|align=center|27
|align=center|5
|align=center|5
|align=center|17
|align=center|22
|align=center|52
|align=center|20
|align=center|
|align=center|
|align=center|
|align=center|
|}

Notes and references

External links
 Official website 

 
Ukrainian Second League clubs
Association football clubs established in 1920
1920 establishments in Ukraine
Football clubs in the Ukrainian Soviet Socialist Republic
Football clubs in Mykolaiv
Black Sea Shipyard
Avanhard (sports society)